Dato’ Shahrum bin Yub (1934 - 2016) was born in Tanjung Malim, Perak, Malaysia on 21 April 1934. His parents were Yeop bin Rawang (a violin teacher) and ‘Chek’ (a mak yong performer). He passed his School Certificate with a Grade One at the Anderson (Secondary) School in Ipoh and was subsequently awarded a Perak State Scholarship to study Anthropology at Leeds University, England. He was the first Malaysian to be awarded a Diploma in Museology from the British Museum. While at Leeds University, he was approached by Tan Sri Mubin Sheppard to join the National Museum in 1966, initially charged with collecting artefacts as a curator of the orang asli gallery. In 1972 he was the first Malaysian to be appointed Director-General of Museums. He retired from public service in 1991 and continued to be involved in the launching of popular exhibitions covering a range of interesting topics.

Dato’ Shahrum was instantly recognized by his three-piece suits and bow-ties. He featured regularly in the Lat cartoon series, identified by his trademark bowtie and suits and curly lock of hair at his forehead.

In 1978, he was a recipient of the Ramon Magsaysay Award 1978 for making a living museum an enlightening experience for all ages, fostering a national cultural awakening in Malaysia. He was awarded the Dato’ Paduka Cura Simanja (DPCM) in 1981, and in 1989, he was the recipient of the Tun Abdul Razak Foundation Award.

References

1934 births
Living people
Malaysian artists
Ramon Magsaysay Award winners